Ethyl macadamiate is the ester of ethyl alcohol and the fatty acids derived from Macadamia ternifolia seed oil. Ethyl macadamiate is used in some cosmetic formulations.

Chemical structure 
Ethyl macadamiate is a mixture of the ethyl esters of the free fatty acids produced by the complete saponification of macadamia oil.  The primary constituents of ethyl macadamiate are ethyl oleate and ethyl palmitoleate.

Physical properties 
Ethyl macadamiate is a clear, colorless liquid at room temperature, with a typical fatty ester odor. Ethyl macadamiate spreads very aggressively, and has a light, nongreasy dry skinfeel similar to that of some silicone derivatives, however, ethyl macadamiate is non-volatile.

Uses 
Ethyl macadamiate is used in cosmetics, especially in skincare, haircare and suncare formulation.  The dry skinfeel and high spread make ethyl macadamiate well suited for increasing sunscreen coverage.  Ethyl macadamiate is an alternative to cyclomethicone and dimethicone as a skinfeel modifier where a botanical, nonvolatile and/or lipid-soluble substance is preferred.

References

Cosmetics chemicals
Ethyl esters
Fatty acid esters